Matikainen is a Finnish surname. Notable people with the surname include:

Jarmo Matikainen (born 1960), Finnish footballer
Pentti Matikainen (born 1950), Finnish ice hockey player and coach
Petri Matikainen (born 1967), Finnish ice hockey player and coach

See also
Marjo Matikainen-Kallström (born 1965), Finnish cross-country skier and politician
Sirkka Sokka-Matikainen, Finnish archer

Finnish-language surnames